Friedrich-Hölderlin-Preis is a German literary prize. It was established in 1983. In June, the City of Bad Homburg vor der Höhe annually awards the prize. It is endowed with 20,000 euros and is awarded as a general literary award for outstanding achievements. The award commemorates the poet Friedrich Hölderlin who lived in Bad Homburg for a few years. It is awarded at the anniversary of the evening before Friedrich Hölderlin's death.

Recipients

 1983: Hermann Burger
 1984: Sarah Kirsch
 1985: Ulla Hahn
 1986: Elisabeth Borchers
 1987: Peter Härtling
 1988: Karl Krolow
 1989: Wolf Biermann
 1990: Rolf Haufs
 1991: Günter Kunert
 1992: Hilde Domin
 1993: Friederike Mayröcker
 1994: Ludwig Harig
 1995: Ernst Jandl
 1996: Martin Walser
 1997: Doris Runge
 1998: Christoph Ransmayr
 1999: Reiner Kunze
 2000: Marcel Reich-Ranicki
 2001: Dieter Wellershoff
 2002: Robert Menasse
 2003: Monika Maron
 2004: Johannes Kühn
 2005: Durs Grünbein
 2006: Rüdiger Safranski
 2007: Urs Widmer
 2008: Ror Wolf
 2009: Judith Hermann
 2010: Georg Kreisler
 2011: Arno Geiger
 2012: Klaus Merz
 2013: Ralf Rothmann
 2014: Peter Stamm
 2015: Michael Kleeberg
 2016: Christoph Peters
 2017: Eva Menasse
 2018: Daniel Kehlmann
 2019: 
 2020: Navid Kermani
 2021: Marcel Beyer
 2022: Monika Rinck

References

External links
 

Friedrich Hölderlin
German literary awards
Awards established in 1983
1983 establishments in Germany